Augustine John (born 11 March 1945) is a Grenadian-born writer, education campaigner, consultant, lecturer and researcher, who moved to the UK in 1964. He has worked in the fields of education policy, management and international development. As a social analyst he specialises in social audits, change management, policy formulation and review, and programme evaluation and development. Since the 1960s he has been active in issues of education and schooling in Britain's inner cities such as Manchester, Birmingham and London, and was the first black Director of Education and Leisure Services in Britain. He has also worked in a number of university settings, including as visiting Faculty Professor of Education at the University of Strathclyde in Glasgow, as an associate professor of education and honorary fellow of the London Centre for Leadership in Learning at the UCL Institute of Education, University of London, and visiting professor at Coventry University. A respected public speaker and media commentator, he works internationally as an executive coach and a management and social investment consultant.

Early life and education
Gus John was born in the village of Concord in Grenada, Eastern Caribbean, to parents who were peasant farmers. At the age of 12, he won a scholarship to attend secondary school at the prestigious Presentation Boys College in St George's, the island's capital. When he was aged 17, he joined a seminary in Trinidad, where he spent two years as a theology student.

At the age of 19, he went to England, transferring to the Theology programme at Oxford University. He became Chair of the Education Subcommittee of the Oxford Committee for Racial Integration (OCRI), and recalls:

Having been a Dominican friar from 1964 to 1967, John split with the order because of the church's links with apartheid South Africa. In the late 1960s he took employment as a gravedigger by day while working by night in an inner-city youth club.

Community activism

Maintaining his interest in "schooling and education, youth development and the empowerment of marginalised groups within communities", John became a community activist. In 1968, he started the first Saturday/Supplementary school in Handsworth, Birmingham, with a group of colleagues. After working on youth and race in Handsworth for the Runnymede Trust, he went in January 1971 to Moss Side, Manchester, where he continued organising and campaigning on four issues in particular: housing and the specific difficulties for young people to get houses on their own; employment for black school leavers; the way the community was policed; and the quality of schooling outcomes for black school leavers. The following year, as he recalled:

In 1972, Because They're Black, a book on which he collaborated with Derek Humphry, was awarded the Martin Luther King Memorial Prize for its contribution to racial harmony in Britain, and Gus John went on to produce many other notable publications. His 1976 work The New Black Presence in Britain was "One of the earliest texts written by a Black Christian in Britain that began to articulate a distinct and conscious experience of black religious sensibilities" and he has been called described as "a grand patriarch of black theology in Britain".

He became a member of the Campaign Against Racial Discrimination (CARD), the civil rights organisation led by David Pitt. By 1981 John was the northern organiser of the New Cross Massacre Action Committee, and one of the organisers of the "Black People's Day of Action" held on 2 March, a response to the New Cross Fire on 18 January in which 13 young black people died. Following the uprisings in Moss Side in July 1981 he chaired the Moss Side Defence Committee, and he was adviser to the Liverpool 8 Defence Committee following the Toxteth Uprisings that same year.

He was the co-ordinator of the Black Parents Movement in Manchester, founded the Education for Liberation book service and helped to organise the International Book Fair of Radical Black and Third World Books in Manchester, London and Bradford. He was a member of the 1987 Macdonald Inquiry into Racism and Racial Violence in Manchester Schools and subsequently co-authored (with Ian Macdonald, Reena Bhavnani and Lily Khan) Murder in the Playground: the Burnage Report. He was a founder trustee of the George Padmore Institute under the chairmanship of John La Rose. In 1989 John was appointed Director of Education in Hackney and was the first black person to hold such a position. When the two departments were amalgamated he became Hackney's first Director of Education and Leisure Services.

Consulting and advisory work
Since leaving Hackney in 1996 Gus John has worked as an education consultant in Europe, the Caribbean and Africa, and is director of Gus John Consultancy Limited. 
He has been Chair of the Communities Empowerment Network (CEN), an advocacy and campaigning service working for equality and justice in education founded in 1999, and is Chair of Parents and Students Empowerment (PaSE), an organisation devoted to empowering students and parents in schooling and education.

He chaired the "Round Table" for the National Union of Teachers (NUT) in October 2006/March 2007 and produced Born to be Great, the NUT's Charter on Promoting the Achievement of Black Caribbean Boys (2007). In 2010, he produced The Case for a Learners' Charter for Schools, a charter that articulates the educational entitlement of all school students and the rights and responsibilities of everybody engaged in the schooling process – local authorities, school governors, teachers, pupils and parents.

He was a member of Channel 4's Street Weapons Commission and later adviser to London Mayor Boris Johnson on serious youth violence in the capital.

Since 2006, John has been a member of the African Union's Technical Committee of Experts working on "modalities for reunifying Africa and its global diaspora". He has advised member states in Africa and the Caribbean (Cameroon, Somaliland, Lagos State Government, Jamaica) in meeting the Sustainable Development Goals related to education and youth. Between 2004 and 2012 John worked on Niger Delta affairs and in 2012 collaborated with Kingsley Kuku, the then special adviser to President Goodluck Jonathan, and David Keighe on a development manual entitled Remaking the Niger Delta: Challenges and Opportunities. In 2008, he co-authored with Samina Zahir Speaking Truth to Power, which resulted from research for Arts Council England on identity, aesthetics and ethnicity in theatre and the arts.

Among other recent undertakings, he has since 2011 been a consultant to the Methodist Church, UK, on implementing Equality and Human Rights legislation, and in 2012 was appointed to chair the Expert Advisory Group on Equality, Diversity and Social Mobility as part of the Legal Education and Training Review (LETR). He was commissioned by the Solicitors Regulation Authority (SRA) to undertake a comparative review of how the SRA has dealt with disciplinary cases and especially the over-representative number of black and ethnic minority solicitors that are sanctioned by that regulator, John's report being published in 2014.

John made a submission to the United Kingdom Parliament's 2017 Youth Violence Commission, which he subsequently published in digest form.

In 2019, John quit from an advisory body to the Church of England, after Archbishop Justin Welby endorsed the criticism of Labour Party leader Jeremy Corbyn by the chief rabbi Ephraim Mirvis, making allegations of antisemitism. John said: "What gives the archbishop of Canterbury the right to endorse the chief rabbi’s scaremongering about Corbyn and adopt such a lofty moral position in defence of the Jewish population?"

Honours

In October 1999, Gus John was asked by Tony Blair to accept a CBE (Commander of the Order of the British Empire) in the New Year Honours List, 2000. Declining, John said that he believed such honours to be anachronistic and indeed an insult to the struggles of African people like himself who have spent their life trying to humanise British society and combating racism, which is a core part of the legacy of Empire and which the society and its institutions are perennially failing to confront. He was quoted by The Guardian as saying:

The journalist Jon Snow, who himself refused an OBE, made a special study of the honours system, writing in The Independent: "Gus John, the Afro-Caribbean former Director of Education for Hackney, explained to me what it felt like for him to be approached with the offer of being appointed CBE. 'I regard [the title] Commander of the British Empire as part of the iconography of British imperialism,' he said." Snow subsequently commented to a Parliamentary Select Committee investigating criticism of the honours system on John's position: "As he had fought his whole life trying to unpick the consequences of British imperialism, he felt it was a pretty serious dishonour to have to wander round the planet henceforth as a Commander of the very institution he had tried to demolish."

In 2015, Gus John's 70th birthday was marked by events honouring his five decades of activism in Britain: on 11 March at Conway Hall, on 14 March at the British Film Institute, in conversation with Gary Younge, and on 19 April at the Phoenix Cinema, in conversation with Margaret Busby.

A 1979 portrait of John, by the photographer Brian Shuel, is in the collection of the National Portrait Gallery.

Professor Gus John was voted one of the "100 Great Black Britons" in the 2020 poll and book initiated by Patrick Vernon.

In October 2020, John was named by FutureLearn on a list of "12 Black history pioneers with careers that will inspire you", together with Lewis Latimer, Shirley Jackson, Lisa Gelobter, Yvonne Connolly, Susie King Taylor, Mary Seacole, Alexa Canady, Charles DeWitt Watts, Kanya King, Oprah Winfrey, and Madam C. J. Walker.

Selected publications

Books and reports

 1970 – Race in the Inner City, a study of young people in Handsworth, Birmingham. London: Runnymede Trust.
 1971 – Because They're Black (with Derek Humphry). London: Penguin. Winner of Martin Luther King Memorial Prize, 1972.
 1972 – Police Power and Black People (with Derek Humphry). London: Panther, Granada Publishing.
 1973 – The Hilton Project – a study of Moss Side, Manchester (with Bryce Anderson, Carol Milton and Tony Pritchard), Manchester: Youth Development Trust.
 1976 – The New Black Presence in Britain. London: British Council of Churches.
 1981 – In the Service of Black Youth: A Study of the Political Culture of Youth and Community Work with Black People in English Cities. Leicester: National Association of Youth Clubs.
 1989 – Murder in the Playground: the Burnage Report (with Ian Macdonald, Reena Bhavnani and Lily Khan). London: Longsight Press.
 1991 – Education for Citizenship. London: Charter 88 Trust. 
 2003 – The Crisis Facing Black Children in the British Schooling System. Gus John Partnership.
 2005 – School Exclusion and Transition into Adulthood in African Caribbean Communities (with Cecile Wright, Penny Standen and Gerry German and Tina Patel). York: Joseph Rowntree Foundation.   
 2006 – Taking A Stand: Gus John Speaks on Education, Race, Social Action and Civil Unrest 1980–2005. Gus John Partnership; .
 2007 – Emancipate Yourself…Choose Life! Essays on the 1807 Abolition of the Slave Trade Act and on gun and knife crime and gang activity in urban areas. Gus John Partnership Limited.
 2007 – Born to be Great: A Charter on Promoting the Achievement of Black Caribbean Boys, National Union of Teachers.
 2008 – Speaking Truth to Power –  critical debate on Identity, Aesthetics and Ethnicity; a diversity of voices in theatre and the Arts in England (with Samina Zahir), Arts Council England.
 2010 – Time to Tell – the Grenada Massacre and After... Grenada Diary 14–25 December 1983. London: Gus John Books.
 2010 – The Case for a Learner’s Charter for Schools (with an introduction by Chris Searle). London: Gus John/New Beacon Books.
 2011 – The New Cross Massacre Story.
 2011 – Moss Side 1981: More Than Just a Riot (with essays by Michael Ignatieff and Paul Rock). Gus John Books; .
 2014 – Report to the Solicitors Regulation Authority on the independent comparative case review of disproportionality in regulatory action and outcomes for BME solicitors, SRA Birmingham, March 2014.

Articles

 1991 – "A View from Britain", in Abdul Alkalimat (ed.), Perspectives on Black Liberation and Social Revolution – Malcolm X:  Radical Tradition and a Legacy of Struggle. Chicago: 21st Century Books.
 1992 – "Education & the Community in a Metropolis", in Michael Barber (ed.), Education in the Capital, London: Cassell Education.

References

External links
 "Gus John – Education, Consultancy & Coaching". Official website.
 Gus John profile at The Guardian.
 "The Issue of Contemporary Education Policies and their impact on black youth", talk at Oxford Symposium on the August 2011 Riots: Context and Responses. University of Oxford podcasts.
 "Talking to Professor Gus John" (interview), Spring 2014. Inclusion Now 37, 19 February 2014. Via Issuu.
 "Black Civil Rights Heroes: Gus John", Black Fathers Support Group.
 "Prof. Gus John's analysis of UK Civil Unrest", BBC News Channel, 9 August 2011. YouTube video.
 Elizabeth Pears, "Professor Gus John: Fighting The Higher Power", The Voice, 21 March 2015.
 "Dr. Gus Augustine (Gus) Gregory John" - African Diaspora in the United Kingdom (Europe) and Grenada (Caribbean)
 

1945 births
20th-century male writers
20th-century non-fiction writers
21st-century male writers
21st-century non-fiction writers
Academics of Coventry University
Alumni of the University of Oxford
Black British activists
Black British writers
British educational theorists
Grenadian emigrants to England
Grenadian male writers
Living people
Male non-fiction writers